Twin Zero are a British progressive rock band, formed in 2003.

Biography
The band's first release was 7" vinyl "Earthbound" on Danish label Futhermocker Records. Released in November 2004, this featured one 7 minute track split over both sides of the record.

In January 2005, the band's debut album Monolith was released on Undergroove Recordings. Following a tour with Boston-based band 27, the bands collaborated in a split EP 27:00, released on Undergroove in August 2005. This EP featured two tracks by each band, plus a remix created from elements of all four songs by Reuben Gotto.

In July 2006, the band released their second album The Tomb to Every Hope again on Undergroove Recordings. This album featured a second bonus disc of remixes of material from debut album Monolith.

The band features a revolving list of musicians, and often features different combinations of musicians at live shows, including two drummers, and occasionally a fully instrumental line-up.

Current line-up
 Karl Middleton - vocals
 Reuben Gotto - guitar
 Bing Garcia - guitar
 Dylan Griffiths - bass guitar
 Dave Cheeseman - keyboards
 Paul Jackson - drums
 Ben Calvert - drums

Former members
 Anf Morfitt - bass guitar
 Si Hutchby - drums
 Jay Graham - drums

Discography
 Earthbound (7" Single, 2004) Futhermocker Records
 Monolith (2005) Undergroove Records
 27:00 (Split EP, 2005) Undergroove Records
 The Tomb To Every Hope (2006) Undergroove Records

External links
 Twin Zero on MySpace
 Twin Zero interview on Rockmidgets.com

British post-rock groups
British progressive rock groups